Eorsa is an uninhabited island in the Inner Hebrides of Scotland.

Geography

Eorsa lies in Loch na Keal on the west coast of the Isle of Mull, to the east of Ulva. It is part of the Loch Na Keal National Scenic Area, one of 40 in Scotland.

History

Many of the nearby islands, including Inchkenneth, have early ecclesiastical connections. Eorsa may have done too. It once belonged to the Abbey of Iona, and became the property of the Duke of Argyll.

During World War I, the island was used as a British naval anchorage.

Cultural references
The island is the fictional setting of Nigel Tranter's 1952 novel Bridal Path, which was made into the film of the same name in 1959.  As the comic novel takes the perils of island inbreeding as its theme, it is assumed that Tranter deliberately chose an unpopulated island to avoid giving offence.

Wildlife
Eorsa is separated from Mull by nearly a mile of water at the closest point so there are very few land animals. Locals on Mull joke that the island is "heaving with adders" although this may not be entirely true. Red deer are good swimmers and could easily make the crossing if they wanted. It is simply a question of whether there is anything the deer want there which can't be found on the mainland.

See also 

 List of islands of Scotland

Footnotes

External links

Uninhabited islands of Argyll and Bute